Jason Martin (born 18 March 1995) is a professional cricketer who plays for Guernsey. He played in the 2016 ICC World Cricket League Division Five tournament. He made his Twenty20 International (T20I) debut for Guernsey against the Isle of Man on 21 August 2020.

References

External links
 

1995 births
Living people
Guernsey cricketers
Guernsey Twenty20 International cricketers
Place of birth missing (living people)